Mordellistena emeryi is a species of beetle in the family Mordellidae and is in the genus Mordellistena. It was described in 1895 by Friedrich Julius Schilsky and can be found in such European countries as Albania, Balearic Islands, Croatia, France, Greece, Italy, and Spain. It can also be found in Near East and North Africa as well.

References

emeryi
Beetles described in 1895
Beetles of Europe